Geoffrey Forbes Lumsden (26 December 1914 – 4 March 1984) was a British character actor who had a lengthy career on television.

Lumsden was born in London in 1914 and attended Repton School, where he was a contemporary of Denton Welch. By the time he had left school, both his parents had died. While living with his uncle he reluctantly trained as an engineer at a colliery. It was at the colliery that he first became interested in acting when he organised concerts for the workforce, and won a scholarship to train at RADA while still working there.

In 1938, he married Judith Cope. Working in repertory theatre, his theatrical career was interrupted by World War II during which he served in Burma. Returning to the theatre after the war, he became a playwright and appeared on various TV shows and films. In 1947, he married Helen A. Syme at Cuckfield in Sussex.
   
On Broadway he appeared as Sir Francis Getliffe in The Affair at the Henry Miller Theatre (1962) and as Major Hugh Beresford Maitland in Hostile Witness at the Music Box Theatre (1966). He wrote and starred in the 1958 farce Caught Napping in the West End. It was later revived in 1978 starring Arthur Lowe, Bill Pertwee and Edward Evans.
 
His best known role was as Captain Square in Dad's Army, the pompous commander of the Eastgate platoon of the Home Guard, who is a rival of Captain Mainwaring.  Other TV appearances included Rookery Nook, Upstairs, Downstairs, It Ain't Half Hot Mum and Edward & Mrs. Simpson.

Lumsden died in London in 1984, aged 69. His uncles were the first-class cricketers Oswald and William Lumsden.

Selected screen credits

Selected stage credits
 The Iron Duchess by William Douglas Home (1957)
 Caught Napping by Geoffrey Lumsden (1959)
 Aunt Edwina by William Douglas Home (1959)

References

External links
 
 

British male television actors
1914 births
1984 deaths
20th-century British male actors
People educated at Repton School
British Army personnel of World War II
Royal Scots officers